A list of horror films released in 1976.

References

Sources

 
 

 
  

Lists of horror films by year